James Willis "J. Will" Taylor (August 28, 1880 – November 14, 1939) was a U.S. Representative from Tennessee.

Biography 
Born near Lead Mine Bend in Union County, Tennessee, Taylor was the son of James W. and Sarah Elizabeth (Rogers) Taylor. He attended the public schools, Holbrook Normal College, Fountain City, Tennessee, and the American Temperance University, Harriman, Tennessee.

Career 
Taylor taught at school for several years, and was graduated from Cumberland School of Law at Cumberland University, Lebanon, Tennessee, in 1902. He was admitted to the bar the same year.

Having moved to La Follette, Tennessee, Taylor commenced the practice of law. He served as postmaster at La Follette from 1904 to 1909. He was also mayor from 1910 to 1913, and in 1918 and 1919. He was Insurance commissioner for the State of Tennessee in 1913 and 1914 and chairman of the Republican State executive committee in 1917 and 1918.

Taylor generally voted with the conservative side, including in his last incomplete House term.

Taylor was elected as a Republican to the Sixty-sixth and to the ten succeeding Congresses and served from March 4, 1919, until his death.
He served as chairman of the Committee on Expenditures in the Department of State (Sixty-eighth and Sixty-ninth Congresses). He served as member of the Republican National Executive Committee 1929–1939.

Death
Taylor died in La Follette, Tennessee, on November 14, 1939 (age 59 years, 78 days). He is interred at Woodlawn Cemetery. A resolution by Walter White honoring Taylor was passed by the Tennessee House of Representatives in 1941.

See also 
 List of United States Congress members who died in office (1900–49)

References

External links 

1880 births
1939 deaths
Mayors of places in Tennessee
Tennessee lawyers
People from LaFollette, Tennessee
Old Right (United States)
Republican Party members of the United States House of Representatives from Tennessee
20th-century American politicians
People from Union County, Tennessee
Tennessee postmasters
20th-century American lawyers